Central Alberta is a region located in the Canadian province of Alberta.

Central Alberta is the most densely populated rural area in the province. Agriculture and energy are important to the area's economy.

Geography
Central Alberta is bordered by the Canadian Rockies in the west, Southern Alberta and the Calgary Region to the south, Saskatchewan to the east and Northern Alberta to the north. It completely surrounds the Edmonton Capital Region and contains the central part of the heavily populated Calgary-Edmonton Corridor.

The North Saskatchewan River crosses the region from west to east. Other rivers traversing the area are Red Deer River, Battle River, Athabasca River, Pembina River, Brazeau River, Beaver River.

Tourist attractions in the region include: Alberta Prairie Railway Excursions, the Canadian Petroleum Discovery Centre in Leduc, Discovery Wildlife Park, Kerry Wood Nature Centre and Gaetz Lake Sanctuary in Red Deer, Nordegg Heritage Centre and Mine Site, Reynolds-Alberta Museum, Rocky Mountain House National Historic Site, Ukrainian Cultural Heritage Village and Stephannson House Provincial Historic Site near Sylvan Lake.

Major national, provincial, and municipal parks include Elk Island National Park, William A. Switzer Provincial Park, Dry Island Buffalo Jump Provincial Park, Big Knife Provincial Park, Pigeon Lake Provincial Park, and Sylvan Lake Park.

A series of roadside attractions known as the Giants of the Prairies can be found in Central Alberta. Large mushrooms in Vilna, huge pumpkins in Smoky Lake, giant Perogy (Ukrainian dumpling) in Glendon, huge Kielbasa (Ukrainian garlic sausage) in Mundare, large Pysanka (Ukrainian easter egg) in Vegreville, a UFO Landing Pad in St. Paul and a giant mallard duck in Andrew.

Demographics
Central Alberta has a population of 240,368 (2004).

Infrastructure
Transportation

Queen Elizabeth II Highway crosses the region from south to north, and the Yellowhead Highway from east to west. Other major highways include Highway 9, Highway 21, Veteran Memorial Highway, David Thomson Highway, Cowboy Trail, Grizzly Trail and Buffalo Trail. Poundmaker Trail runs through the north-east of the region.

Health Regions

The following health regions are located in the region: Aspen Regional Health Authority, David Thompson Regional Health Authority and East Central Health.

Education

Post-secondary institutions in the region are Red Deer Polytechnic, Olds College, Lakeland College, Burman University and the University of Alberta Augustana Faculty (Camrose).

Politics
On a provincial level, central Alberta is represented in the Legislative Assembly of Alberta by MLA's elected in the ridings of Battle River-Wainwright, Drayton Valley-Calmar, Drumheller-Stettler, Fort Saskatchewan-Vegreville, Innisfail-Sylvan Lake, Lacombe-Ponoka, Leduc-Beaumont-Devon, Olds-Didsbury-Three Hills, Red Deer North, Red Deer South, Rocky Mountain House, Stony Plain, Vermilion-Lloydminster, West Yellowhead, Wetaskiwin-Camrose and Whitecourt-Ste. Anne.

Communities
The region spreads across several census divisions: 7, 8, 9, 10, 14 and parts of divisions 11, 12 and 13.

Cities
Camrose
Cold Lake
Lacombe
Lloydminster
Red Deer
Wetaskiwin

Towns
Barrhead
Bashaw
Bentley
Blackfalds
Bonnyville
Bowden
Carstairs
Castor
Coronation
Daysland
Didsbury
Drayton Valley
Eckville
Edson
Elk Point
Hanna
Hardisty
Hinton
Innisfail
Killam
Lamont
Mayerthorpe
Millet
Mundare
Olds
Onoway
Penhold
Ponoka
Provost
Rimbey
Rocky Mountain House
Sedgewick
Smoky Lake
St. Paul
Stettler
Sundre
Sylvan Lake
Tofield
Two Hills
Vegreville
Vermilion
Viking
Wainwright
Westlock
Whitecourt

Villages
Alberta Beach
Alix
Alliance
Amisk
Andrew
Bawlf
Big Valley
Bittern Lake
Botha
Breton
Caroline
Chauvin
Chipman
Clive
Clyde
Consort
Cremona
Czar
Delburne
Dewberry
Donalda
Edberg
Edgerton
Elnora
Ferintosh
Forestburg
Gadsby
Galahad
Glendon
Halkirk
Hay Lakes
Heisler
Holden
Hughenden
Innisfree
Irma
Kitscoty
Lougheed
Mannville
Marwayne
Myrnam
Paradise Valley
Rosalind
Ryley
Sangudo
Spring Lake
Strome
Veteran
Vilna
Waskatenau
Willingdon

Summer villages
Argentia Beach
Birch Cove
Birchcliff
Bonnyville Beach
Burnstick Lake
Castle Island
Crystal Springs
Grandview
Gull Lake
Half Moon Bay
Horseshoe Bay
Jarvis Bay
Larkspur
Ma-Me-O Beach
Nakamun Park
Norglenwold
Norris Beach
Parkland Beach
Pelican Narrows
Poplar Bay
Rochon Sands
Ross Haven
Sandy Beach
Silver Beach
Silver Sands
South View
Sunbreaker Cove
Sunrise Beach
Sunset Point
Val Quentin
West Cove
White Sands
Yellowstone

Improvement districts
Improvement District No. 13 (Elk Island)

Municipal districts
Barrhead No. 11, County of
Beaver County
Bonnyville No. 87, M.D. of
Brazeau County
Camrose County
Clearwater County
Flagstaff County
Lac Ste. Anne County
Lacombe County
Lamont County
Minburn No. 27, County of
Mountain View County
Paintearth No. 18, County of
Ponoka County
Provost No. 52, M.D. of
Red Deer County
Smoky Lake County
St. Paul No. 19, County of
Stettler No. 6, County of
Thorhild County
Two Hills No. 21, County of
Vermilion River, County of
Wainwright No. 61, M.D. of
Westlock County
Wetaskiwin No. 10, County of
Woodlands County
Yellowhead County

Special areas
Special Area No. 4

See also
List of regions of Canada

References

External links

Central Alberta
Travel Alberta - Central Alberta
Alberta Regions - Alberta Heritage

 
Geographic regions of Alberta